Tangshan No.1 High School (pinyin: Tángshān shì dìyī zhōngxué), commonly abbreviated as Tangshan Yizhong, is a public high school in Hebei province, China. It was established in 1902 by the Yong Ping Government (Tangshan Government) during the Qing Dynasty, known as the Yong Ping Zhongli High School.

History

Late Qing Dynasty period

ROC period

PRC period

School culture

Title
The calligraphic title Tangshan Yizhong (唐山一中, literally Tangshan No.1 High School ) was inscribed by Fei Xiaotong.

School emblem
The school emblem features the old school gate built in 1902.

Motto
The school motto is "rigor, love, diligence and simplicity"(严、爱、勤、朴).

Anthem
The school anthem is Song of Tangshan No.1 High School.

Campus

Old campus

Current campus

Teaching Building
There are several buildings on campus in which the children are taught.

Notable teachers

See also
Beijing No.4 High School
Hengshui High School
Shijiazhuang No.2 High School

External links

 Official web site

Educational institutions established in 1902
High schools in Tangshan
1902 establishments in China